Embidopsocus enderleini is a species of Psocoptera from the Liposcelididae family that can be found in Great Britain and Ireland. The species are brown coloured.

References 

Liposcelididae
Stenopsocidae
Insects described in 1905
Psocoptera of Europe
Fauna of Great Britain
Fauna of Ireland